Nalanda College may refer to:

 Nalanda College, Biharsharif, a college in Bihar Sharif, Bihar, India
 Nalanda College, Colombo, a government Buddhist school in Colombo, Sri Lanka
 Nalanda College of Engineering, in situated in Chandi near Nalanda
 Nalanda Medical College, in Kankarbagh, Patna
 Nalanda Maha Vidyalaya (disambiguation), collection of central colleges in Sri Lanka